Georges Berton (13 December 1907 – 26 April 2001) was a French racing cyclist. He rode in the 1929 Tour de France.

References

1907 births
2001 deaths
French male cyclists
Place of birth missing